Office in a Small City is a 1953 painting by the American realist painter Edward Hopper. It is owned by the Metropolitan Museum of Art in New York City.

The painting depicts a man sitting in a corner office surveying the landscape outdoors. The painting depicts loneliness and beauty in a uniquely stark yet pleasing fashion, a common theme amongst Hopper's works. It was described by Hopper's wife as "the man in concrete wall."

References

1953 paintings
Cityscape paintings
Paintings by Edward Hopper
Paintings in the collection of the Metropolitan Museum of Art